Anatoli Boisa ( born 9 September 1983) is a Georgian professional retired basketball player. Currently, he is the head coach of BC Rustavi in the Georgian Basketball Super League, and an Assistant coach of the Georgian national basketball team.

He represented the Georgian national basketball team at the EuroBasket 2017 qualification.

References

External links
Georgian Superleague profile
Eurobasket.com profile
NJCAA profile

Videos
Anatoli Boisa -- reFRESH! - Youtube.com video 

1983 births
Living people
Expatriate basketball people from Georgia (country) in Germany
Expatriate basketball people from Georgia (country) in the United States
Men's basketball players from Georgia (country)
Midland Chaps basketball players
People from Rustavi
Small forwards